The Chicago Pedway is a network of tunnels, ground-level concourses and bridges connecting skyscrapers, retail stores, hotels, and train stations throughout the central business district of Chicago, Illinois.

With a length of more than 40 downtown blocks, it contains shops, restaurants, and public art and helps pedestrians in inclement weather. Most connections to the pedway are commercial or government buildings, including hotels. Columbus Plaza, The Heritage at Millennium Park, the Park Millennium, 200 North Dearborn Apartments, and Aqua are the only residential buildings connected to the pedway.

History
The oldest portions of the Pedway, aside from the interiors of some included buildings, are the corridors between State and Dearborn Streets, linking Chicago Transit Authority's Red Line and Blue Line stations at Washington and Lake Streets and at Jackson Street. These were constructed with the subways; while the completion and outfitting of the Blue Line under Dearborn Street were interrupted by rationing in World War II, the two mezzanine connector tunnels were opened and linked the Red Line under State Street to the sidewalks of Dearborn Street.

Construction on the pedway proper began in 1951 and has continued since then, especially after expansion was included in both 1968's Transit Planning Study: Chicago Central Area and the Chicago 21 Plan introduced in 1973.

The smaller but more elaborate eastern section of the pedway, connecting the Illinois Center buildings, Hyatt Regency, Fairmont Hotel, Swissôtel, and (later) Aqua, are indirectly accessible from the main (Loop-centric) pedway network, as each is linked to one end of the Metra Electric Line rail platforms. Since the Regional Transportation Authority's removal of the turnstiles in November 2003, the two large pedway sections have been united by the platforms. 

The southern reach of the main network was reduced when the 2nd floor passage across Madison Street, linking Three First National Plaza with Bank One Plaza (now Chase Tower), was removed after the two buildings restricted public access to upper levels. The tunnels between Chase Tower and Two First National Plaza remain but are closed to the general public. Chase Tower is still connected to the Blue Line subway and to the restaurant structure in the south-west corner of the adjoining Exelon Plaza, and public access is permitted during workday hours.

In December 2013, 22 stained glass panels were installed on the wall opposite the entrance to Macy's food court, in a collaboration with the Smith Museum of Stained Glass Windows; these remain in place, although the museum has closed. The Environmental Law and Policy Center plans to install more art exhibits and a public library as part of a revitalization of the Pedway.

Numerous smaller pedways throughout the central business district are not connected to the main network. These include the tunnel below Quincy Street and the Dirksen Federal Courthouse, connecting the Red and Blue Lines' Jackson Street stations; within and between the Ogilvie Transportation Center and 2 North Riverside Plaza; within and between the Merchandise Mart and Apparel Center; and the passageways under Chase Tower's Exelon Plaza.

Entrances
Points of entry and exit for the Pedway include:
 One North Dearborn Street
 One North State Street
 2 North Riverside Plaza
 One Prudential Plaza (130 East Randolph Street)
 Two First National Plaza
 Two Prudential Plaza (180 North Stetson Avenue)
 Three First National Plaza (70 West Madison Street)
 25 East Washington Street
 77 West Wacker Drive
 120 North LaSalle
 139 North Wabash Avenue
 200 North Dearborn Apartments
 201 North Clark Street
 203 North LaSalle Street
 303 East Wacker Drive
 Aon Center (200 East Randolph Street)
 Aqua
 Block 37 shopping mall at 108 North State Street
 Blue Cross Blue Shield Tower (300 East Randolph Street)
 Boulevard Towers
 Chase Tower
 City Hall/County Building
 Chicago Cultural Center (formerly main library & GAR memorial)
 Chicago Title and Trust Center (181 North Clark Street)
 Columbus Plaza
 Richard J. Daley Bicentennial Plaza
 Richard J. Daley Center (50 West Washington Street)
 In front of the Dirksen Federal Building (interior not connected) (219 South Dearborn Street)
 George W. Dunne Cook County Administration Building (69 West Washington Street)
 Fairmont Hotel Chicago
 Grant Park underground parking garages
 The Heritage at Millennium Park (130 North Garland Court)
 Hyatt Regency Hotel
 Illinois Center
 Lake CTA Red Line station
 Leo Burnett Building (35 West Wacker Drive)
 Macy's in the Marshall Field and Company Building
 Millennium Park
 Ogilvie Transportation Center (500 West Madison Street)
 Millennium Station (formerly Randolph Street Terminal)
 Park Millennium
 Jay Pritzker Pavilion
 Renaissance Chicago Downtown Hotel (formerly Stouffer Riviere)
 150 North Michigan Avenue
 The Sporting Club at Illinois Center
 Swissôtel Chicago
 James R. Thompson Center (100 West Randolph Street)
 Washington CTA Blue Line station

See also
 Underground city
 Block 37
 Minneapolis Skyway System
 PATH

References

External links

Downtown Chicago pedway and cut-throughs (Chicago CartoGraphics) (2015)
Chicago Detours: Current as of 2020, a user friendly, free downloadable pdf Pedway Map
Inside Chicago Walking Tours: Pedway Walking Tour & Secrets of the Loop
Chicago Pedway map and legend at City of Chicago as a PDF document (2013)
Chicago Pedway maps made with 2010 (edited 2011) City of Chicago data and Pedway segment information at wvaughan.org
Chicago Pedway online map and high quality printable (2008?) PDF map at spiegl.org
Subterranean City: A Tour of Chicago's Pedway (2004)
Chicago Pedway group on Flickr
OpenStreetMap Chicago Pedway
Waymarked Trails

Pedway
Skyways
Underground cities
Pedways in the United States
Homelessness in the United States
Pedestrian tunnels in the United States